Jagannath Shivram Patil is an Indian politician and member of the Bharatiya Janata Party. Patil was a member of the Maharashtra Legislative Assembly from Ambernath in 1978 and Kalyan in 1995. He was also member of Lok Sabha from Thane constituency in 1980s.

References 

People from Kalyan-Dombivli
Bharatiya Janata Party politicians from Maharashtra
Members of the Maharashtra Legislative Assembly
Living people
21st-century Indian politicians
Maharashtra politicians
India MPs 1980–1984
Lok Sabha members from Maharashtra
Politicians from Thane
Year of birth missing (living people)